Indigo Lake is a Cuyahoga Valley Scenic Railroad train station in Cuyahoga Falls, Ohio, with a street address in Peninsula, Ohio. It is located adjacent to Indigo Lake and Riverview Road in the Cuyahoga Valley National Park.

References

External links

Cuyahoga Valley Scenic Railroad stations